The Church of Jesus Christ of Latter-day Saints in the Democratic Republic of the Congo refers to the Church of Jesus Christ of Latter-day Saints (LDS Church) and its members in the Democratic Republic of the Congo (DRC). As of 2019, the LDS Church reported 68,871 members in 211 congregations in the DRC, making it the third largest body of LDS Church members in Africa, behind Nigeria and Ghana. Currently, the DRC ranks as having the 16th highest LDS growth rate among countries of the world, with an annual growth rate of 13 percent.

History

The LDS Church was first recognized in Zaire in 1986. That year the first missionaries began preaching in Kinshasa. The establishment of the church was aided by the Banza family, who had joined the church while studying at a university in Geneva, Switzerland. The third petitioner to establish the church that year was Nkitabungi Mbuyi, who had joined while studying in Belgium and subsequently served as a missionary for the church in England before his return to Zaire. The church has grown quickly since then, with the first stake being organised in 1996.

Since establishing itself in the country, the LDS Church has played a large role in providing humanitarian aid services in the nation. This has involved installing clean water distribution systems in areas where sanitation and water are low.

In 2011, it was reported that the church had reached a total of 100 congregations in the DRC.

By late 2019, the church had 22 stakes and one district as well as several branches directly under missions in the DRC.

Missions

Temples

On October 1, 2011 the Kinshasa Democratic Republic of the Congo Temple was announced by church president Thomas S. Monson. On February 12, 2016 ground was broken for the temple in a ceremony conducted by Neil L. Andersen of the Quorum of the Twelve Apostles. The temple was dedicated by Dale G. Renlund on April 14, 2019. On April 5, 2020, the Lubumbashi Democratic Republic of the Congo Temple was announced by church president Russell M. Nelson, with another to be built in Kananga announced on October 3, 2021.

See also

The Church of Jesus Christ of Latter-day Saints membership statistics
The Church of Jesus Christ of Latter-day Saints in Ghana
Religion in the Democratic Republic of the Congo
Christianity in the Democratic Republic of the Congo

References

External links
The Church of Jesus Christ of Latter-day Saints Official site
Kinshasa Democratic Republic of the Congo Temple at ChurchofJesusChristTemples.org

Christian denominations in the Democratic Republic of the Congo
Christian organizations established in 1988
Congo